James Chalmers McRuer  (August 23, 1890 – October 6, 1985) was a Canadian lawyer, judge, commissioner and author in Ontario.

Biography 
Born in Ayr, Oxford County, Ontario, he received his law education from the Osgoode Hall Law School and was called to the Bar of Ontario in 1913. During World War I, he served in the Canadian Field Artillery as a lieutenant. After the war, from 1921 to 1925 he was an Assistant Crown Attorney for Toronto and County of York. From 1930 to 1935, he was a lecturer at Osgoode Hall Law School. He ran unsuccessfully as the Liberal candidate in High Park in the 1935 federal election losing to Alexander James Anderson.

McRuer was active in the Canadian Bar Association, and served first as President of the Ontario Bar Association from 1943 to 1944, and then as national President of the Canadian Bar Association from 1946 to 1947.

In 1944, he was appointed to the Court of Appeal for Ontario and in 1945 was appointed Chief Justice of the High Court of Justice for the Province of Ontario. He resigned in 1964. As Chief Justice he served on various Royal Commissions and was Chairman of the Ontario Law Reform Commission from 1964 to 1966 and Vice-Chairman until 1977. He also served as President of the Canadian Bar Association while on the bench. Beginning in 1964, McRuer headed the Royal Commission Inquiry into Civil Rights (known as the McRuer commission).

He wrote the books The Evolution of the Judicial Process (1957) and The Trial of Jesus (1978).

In 1968, he was made an Officer of the Order of Canada "for his services in the profession of law and as a member of many Royal Commissions".

Works

References

External links
 
 

1890 births
1985 deaths
Judges in Ontario
Lawyers in Ontario
Canadian Bar Association Presidents
Candidates in the 1935 Canadian federal election
Members of the United Church of Canada
Officers of the Order of Canada
Osgoode Hall Law School alumni
Academic staff of the Osgoode Hall Law School
People from Oxford County, Ontario
Royal Regiment of Canadian Artillery personnel
Liberal Party of Canada candidates for the Canadian House of Commons
Canadian military personnel of World War I
Canadian Militia officers
Canadian Expeditionary Force officers